Eching am Ammersee is a municipality in the district of Landsberg in Bavaria in Germany. It has a size of 6.15km2.

Situated at the northern shore of the Ammersee at an elevation of 541m, it borders the Naturschutzgebiet "Ampermoos" and the wooded recreation area "Weingarten".

Districts 
 Eching
 Gießübl

History 
Eching belonged to the Electorate of Bavaria and was part of the Hofmark Greifenberg of the Freiherrn von Perfall. Its current form was established in the Gemeindeedikt of 1818.

Population

Politics

Mayor 
Mayor since May 1996 is Siegfried Luge (CSU) (born 1943). The last election was on 15 March 2020.

Town Council 
For the first time after 36 years CSU and the local grouping "Bürgerblock" had separate lists in the election. The "Bürgerblock" won 9 seats, CSU won 3.

References

Landsberg (district)
Ammersee